Lasagna or Lasagne, wide and flat pasta 
 Lasagna (song), a song by "Weird Al" Yankovic
 Fabrizio Lasagna, an Italian footballer
 Kevin Lasagna, an Italian footballer 
 Louis Lasagna, an American physician and professor of medicine
 Bitch Lasagna, also known as "T-Series Diss Track", a song by PewDiePie